David Everett Rumelhart (June 12, 1942 – March 13, 2011) was an American psychologist who made many contributions to the formal analysis of human cognition, working primarily within the frameworks of mathematical psychology, symbolic artificial intelligence, and parallel distributed processing. He also admired formal linguistic approaches to cognition, and explored the possibility of formulating a formal grammar to capture the structure of stories.

Biography
Rumelhart was born in Mitchell, South Dakota on June 12, 1942. His parents were Everett Leroy and Thelma Theora (Ballard) Rumelhart. He began his college education at the University of South Dakota, receiving a B.A. in psychology and mathematics in 1963. He studied mathematical psychology at Stanford University, receiving his Ph.D. in 1967. From 1967 to 1987 he served on the faculty of the Department of Psychology at the University of California, San Diego. In 1987 he moved to Stanford University, serving as Professor there until 1998. Rumelhart was elected to the National Academy of Sciences in 1991 and received many prizes, including a MacArthur Fellowship in July 1987, the Warren Medal of the Society of Experimental Psychologists, and the APA Distinguished Scientific Contribution Award. Rumelhart, co-recipient with James McClelland, won the 2002 University of Louisville Grawemeyer Award in Psychology.

Rumelhart became disabled by Pick's disease, a progressive neurodegenerative disease, and at the end of his life lived with his brother in Ann Arbor, Michigan. He died in Chelsea, Michigan. He is survived by two sons.

Work
Rumelhart was the first author of a highly cited paper from 1985 (co-authored by Geoffrey Hinton and Ronald J. Williams) that applied the back-propagation algorithm (also known as the reverse mode of automatic differentiation published by Seppo Linnainmaa in 1970) to multi-layer neural networks. This work showed through experiments that such networks can learn useful internal representations of data. The approach has been widely used for basic cognition researches (e.g., memory, visual recognition) and practical applications. This paper, however, does not cite earlier work of the backpropagation method, such as the 1974 dissertation of Paul Werbos.

In the same year, Rumelhart also published Parallel Distributed Processing: Explorations in the Microstructure of Cognition with James McClelland, which described their creation of computer simulations of perceptrons, giving to computer scientists their first testable models of neural processing, and which is now regarded as a central text in the field of cognitive science.

Rumelhart's models of semantic cognition and specific knowledge in a diversity of learned domains using initially non-hierarchical neuron-like processing units continue to interest scientists in the fields of artificial intelligence, anthropology, information science, and decision science.

In his honor, in 2000 the Robert J. Glushko and Pamela Samuelson Foundation created the David E. Rumelhart Prize for Contributions to the Theoretical Foundations of Human Cognition. A Review of General Psychology survey, published in 2002, ranked Rumelhart as the 88th most cited psychologist of the 20th century, tied with John Garcia, James J. Gibson, Louis Leon Thurstone, Margaret Floy Washburn, and Robert S. Woodworth.

References

External links
 David E. Rumelhart Prize
 Dictionary of Philosophy of Mind
 The PDP-Group
 The PDP++ Software Home Page
 NY Times Obituary

1942 births
2011 deaths
Computational psychologists
American cognitive neuroscientists
MacArthur Fellows
Members of the United States National Academy of Sciences
Fellows of the American Academy of Arts and Sciences
University of South Dakota alumni
Stanford University alumni
Stanford University Department of Psychology faculty
People from Jerauld County, South Dakota
Deaths from dementia in Michigan
Deaths from Pick's disease
Fellows of the Cognitive Science Society
People from Mitchell, South Dakota